Wolf Among Wolves (German:Wolf unter Wölfen) is a 1965 East German television series, based on the 1938 novel Wolf Among Wolves by Hans Fallada. It was aired in four parts on DFF. The series portrays life in the 1920s Berlin of the Weimar Republic. It was the first East German television series to air in West Germany.

Partial cast
 Armin Mueller-Stahl as  Wolfgang Pagel  
 Wolfgang Langhoff as  Rittmeister von Prackwitz 
 Herbert Köfer as  Gutsverwalter von Studmann  
 Annekathrin Bürger as  Petra Ledig 
 Agnes Kraus as  Frau Thumann 
 Marga Legal as  Frau Pagel  
 Friedel Nowack as  Minna 
 Else Wolz as  Mutter Krupaß  
 Ingeborg Naß as  Valuten-Vamp 
 Erik S. Klein as  von Zecke

References

Bibliography
 Campbell, Russell. Marked Women: Prostitutes and Prostitution in the Cinema. University of Wisconsin Press, 2006.

External links

German drama television series
1960s German television miniseries
Television shows based on German novels
1965 German television series debuts
1965 German television series endings
Television series set in the 1920s
Television in East Germany
German-language television shows
Adaptations of works by Hans Fallada